Bahna is a commune in Neamț County, Western Moldavia, Romania. It is composed of eight villages: Arămești, Bahna, Băhnișoara, Broșteni, Izvoare, Liliac, Țuțcanii din Deal and Țuțcanii din Vale.

Natives
 Conon Arămescu-Donici
 Constantin Schifirneț

References 

Communes in Neamț County
Localities in Western Moldavia